Reily Township is one of thirteen townships in Butler County, Ohio, United States. It is located in the west-central part of the county. It had a population of 2,660 at the 2020 census.

History
It was the eighth in order of creation, erected from St. Clair Township by the Butler County Commissioners on December 7, 1807, with these boundaries.

The first election of township officers was at Henry Burget's home on January 2, 1808.

Geography
Located in the western part of the county, it borders the following townships:
Oxford Township - north
Milford Township - northeast corner
Hanover Township - east
Ross Township - southeast corner
Morgan Township - south
Whitewater Township, Franklin County, Indiana - southwest corner
Springfield Township, Franklin County, Indiana - west
Bath Township, Franklin County, Indiana - northwest corner

Name
The only Reily Township statewide, it is named for John Reily (1763–1850), the former Clerk of the Northwest Territory and the first Butler County clerk of courts.

Government
The township is governed by a three-member board of trustees, who are elected in November of odd-numbered years to a four-year term beginning on the following January 1.  Two are elected in the year after the presidential election and one is elected in the year before it.  There is also an elected township fiscal officer, who serves a four-year term beginning on April 1 of the year after the election, which is held in November of the year before the presidential election.  Vacancies in the fiscal officership or on the board of trustees are filled by the remaining trustees.

Public services
The township is in the Talawanda City School District.

Major highways include U.S. Route 27, the road between Cincinnati, Ohio, and Richmond, Indiana; State Route 129, which travels from Hamilton, Ohio, to the Indiana border; and State Route 732.

References

Bert S. Barlow, W.H. Todhunter, Stephen D. Cone, Joseph J. Pater, and Frederick Schneider, eds.  Centennial History of Butler County, Ohio.  Hamilton, Ohio:  B.F. Bowen, 1905.
Jim Blount.  The 1900s:  100 Years In the History of Butler County, Ohio.  Hamilton, Ohio:  Past Present Press, 2000.
Butler County Engineer's Office.  Butler County Official Transportation Map, 2003.  Fairfield Township, Butler County, Ohio:  The Office, 2003.
A History and Biographical Cyclopaedia of Butler County, Ohio with Illustrations and Sketches of Its Representative Men and Pioneers.  Cincinnati, Ohio:  Western Biographical Publishing Company, 1882. 
Ohio. Secretary of State.  The Ohio municipal and township roster, 2002-2003.  Columbus, Ohio:  The Secretary, 2003.

External links
County website

Townships in Butler County, Ohio
Townships in Ohio
1807 establishments in Ohio
Populated places established in 1807